Ma'dhar was a Palestinian village in the Tiberias Subdistrict. It was depopulated during the 1947–1948 Civil War in Mandatory Palestine on May 12, 1948, by the Golani Brigade of Operation Gideon. It was located 12.5 km southwest of Tiberias.

History
Ceramics from the Byzantine  era have been found here.

The Crusaders referred to Ma'dhar as Kapharmater.

Ottoman era
Ma'dhar was incorporated into the Ottoman Empire in 1517, and by 1596, it was a village  under the administration of the nahiya ("subdistrict") of Tiberias, part of Safad Sanjak. The village had a population of 17 households, an estimated 94 inhabitants, all Muslim. The villagers paid a fixed tax rate of 25% on wheat, barley, goats, beehives and orchards; a total of 2,000 Akçe. A map from Napoleon's invasion of 1799 by Pierre Jacotin  showed the place, named as Chara, but misplaced.

In 1881, the PEF's Survey of Western Palestine (SWP)  described the village as having about 250 Muslim residents, in a village made of  basalt and other stone. Water was  supplied from cisterns and springs.

A population list from about 1887 showed  Madher to have  about  975  inhabitants;  all Muslims.

British Mandate era
At the time of the 1922 census of Palestine, Madhar had a population of 347 Muslims, increasing slightly to 359 Muslims living in 91 houses by the 1931 census.

By the 1945 statistics, the village population was 480 Muslims,  and the total land area was  11,666  dunums of land.   498 dunams  were irrigated or used for orchards,   10,766 used for  cereals,  while 63 dunams were built-up (urban) land.

Ma'dhar had a school founded by the Ottomans, but closed during the British Mandate period. Ma'dhar contained a mosque and still has the ruins of a church, a burial ground, and ruined Crusader fortress called Casel de Cherio.

Post 1948

In 1992, the village site was described: "The site has been fenced in and is used as an Israeli grazing area. A large cluster of cactus grows in the midst of the stone rubble of houses, and there is a well, capped with a pump, in the center of the site. About 20 m to the west of the well is a drinking trough for animals. Eucalyptus, doum palm, and chinaberry trees grow on the site."

References

Bibliography

 
  

 

  

 

 
  (Thomson, 1882,  p. 329)

External links
Welcome To Ma'dhar
Ma'dhar, Zochrot
Survey of Western Palestine, Map 6: IAA, Wikimedia commons

Arab villages depopulated during the 1948 Arab–Israeli War
District of Tiberias